Patrick Sky (born Patrick Linch; October 2, 1940May 26, 2021) was an American musician, folk singer, songwriter, and record producer.  He was noted for his album Songs That Made America Famous (1973).  He was of Irish and Native American ancestry, and played Irish traditional music and uilleann pipes in the later part of his career.

Early life
Sky was born in College Park, Georgia, on October 2, 1940.  He was of Muscogee and Irish descent.  He grew up near the Lafourche Swamps of Louisiana, where he learned guitar, banjo, and harmonica.  He moved to New York City after military service in the early 1960s, and began playing traditional folk songs in clubs before starting to write his own material.

Career
A close contemporary of Dave Van Ronk and others in the Greenwich Village folk boom, Sky released four well received albums from 1965 to 1969. He played with many of the leading performers of the period, particularly Buffy Sainte-Marie, Eric Andersen and the blues singer Mississippi John Hurt (whose Vanguard albums Sky produced). Sky's song "Many a Mile" became a folk club staple; it has been recorded by Sainte-Marie and others.

Being politically radical, Sky wrote, recorded, and released the satirical Songs That Made America Famous in 1973 (the album was recorded in 1971 but rejected by several record companies before it found a home).  This album featured the earliest known recorded version of the song "Luang Prabang", written by Sky's friend Dave Van Ronk.  Sky had honed his politically charged satire in earlier albums, but Songs That Made America Famous raised the stakes. The Adelphi Records website describes how the content was, indeed, shocking, yet how several critics encouraged the public to rush to buy these timely and brilliant "explicit lyrics" while it could.  Sky gradually moved into the field of Irish traditional music, producing artists, and founding Green Linnet Records in 1973.  He was recognised as an expert in building and playing the Irish uilleann pipes, often performing with his wife, Cathy.

Sky edited a reissued version of the important 19th century dance tune book Ryan's Mammoth Collection in 1995.  This was followed up with a reissue of Howe's 1000 Jigs and Reels six years later.

Sky released his final full-length studio album, Through a Window, in 1985.

Personal life
Sky married Cathy Larson Sky in 1981.  They met three years earlier and moved to North Carolina six years after getting married.  Together, they had one child, Liam.

Sky died on May 26, 2021, while in hospice care in Asheville, North Carolina.  He was 80, and suffered from prostate cancer and bone cancer prior to his death.  He had also been diagnosed with Parkinson's disease in 2017.

Discography
 Singer Songwriter Project (Elektra, 1965) (Sky is one of four artists, contributing three tracks, alongside David Cohen, Richard Fariña, and Bruce Murdoch)
 Patrick Sky (1965)
 A Harvest of Gentle Clang (1966)
 Reality Is Bad Enough (1968)
 Photographs (1969)
 Songs That Made America Famous (1973) (also Producer)
 Two Steps Forward, One Step Back (1975) (also Producer)
 Through a Window (1985) (also Producer)

With Cathy Sky
 Down to Us (2009)

Legacy
The refrain of the title song of his third album, "Reality is bad enough, why should I tell the truth?" is included in Buckminster Fuller's 1970 book, I Seem to Be a Verb.

Joni Mitchell identified Sky as "Richard" from her song "The Last Time I Saw Richard" from her Blue album.

See also
 Folk music

Citations

General bibliography 
 Okun, Milton (1968).  Something to Sing About.  New York: Macmillan.

External links
 Patrick Sky and Cathy Sky's webpage – Official website of Patrick and Cathy Sky, including a biography and a link to a discography
 Adelphi Records – In-context description of the album Songs That Made America Famous and contemporaneous reviews
 

1940 births
2021 deaths
American male singer-songwriters
American people of Irish descent
American people of Native American descent
Singer-songwriters from Georgia (U.S. state)